High Risk may refer to:
High Risk (TV series), 1988 American television series
High Risk (1981 film), a film written and directed by Stewart Raffill
High Risk (1995 film), an action film starring Jet Li
High Risk (1999 film), a Hong Kong movie starring Jackie Chan, originally known under the title Gorgeous
High Risk (album), a 2015 album by Dave Douglas
High Risk (novel), written under the pseudonym, Carolyn Keene
High Risk Books, a defunct publisher in New York City